Ozbak is a village in Doreh Rural District, in the Central District of Sarbisheh County, South Khorasan Province, Iran. At the 2006 census, its population was 108, in 28 families.

References 

Populated places in Sarbisheh County